Josef Tomáš (born 1898, date of death unknown) was a Czech weightlifter. He competed in the men's middleweight event at the 1924 Summer Olympics.

References

External links
 

1898 births
Year of death missing
Czech male weightlifters
Olympic weightlifters of Czechoslovakia
Weightlifters at the 1924 Summer Olympics
Place of birth missing